Víctor Manuel Azúcar Urrutia (born 20 September 1946, date of death unknown) was a Salvadoran footballer. He competed in the men's tournament at the 1968 Summer Olympics.

References

External links
 

1946 births
Year of death missing
Salvadoran footballers
El Salvador international footballers
Olympic footballers of El Salvador
Footballers at the 1968 Summer Olympics
Sportspeople from San Salvador
Association football forwards